The Western Australian Legislative Assembly is elected from 59 single-member electoral districts. These districts are often referred to as electorates or seats.

The Electoral Distribution Act 1947 requires regular review of electoral boundaries, in order to keep the relative size of electorates within certain limits.  Electoral boundaries are determined by the Western Australian Electoral Commission. Electoral districts are subdivisions of electoral regions for the Legislative Council and have approximately an equal number of electors. The last electoral redistribution was completed in November 2019 and was first applied in the 2021 state election.

List of electoral districts by electoral region
 Agricultural electoral region
 Central Wheatbelt
 Geraldton
 Moore
 Roe
 East Metropolitan electoral region
 Armadale
 Bassendean
 Belmont
 Darling Range
 Forrestfield
 Kalamunda
 Maylands
 Midland
 Mirrabooka
 Morley
 Mount Lawley
 Swan Hills
 Thornlie
 West Swan
 Mining and Pastoral electoral region
 Kalgoorlie
 Kimberley
 North West Central
 Pilbara
 North Metropolitan electoral region
 Balcatta
 Burns Beach
 Butler
 Carine
 Churchlands
 Cottesloe
 Hillarys
 Joondalup
 Kingsley
 Landsdale
 Nedlands
 Perth
 Scarborough
 Wanneroo
South Metropolitan electoral region
 Baldivis
 Bateman
 Bicton
 Cannington
 Cockburn
 Fremantle
 Jandakot
 Kwinana
 Riverton
 Rockingham
 South Perth
 Southern River
 Victoria Park
 Warnbro
 Willagee
South West electoral region
 Albany
 Bunbury
 Collie-Preston
 Dawesville
 Mandurah
 Murray-Wellington
 Vasse
 Warren-Blackwood

See also
 Electoral regions of Western Australia

References

External links
 Western Australian Electoral Commission
 Electoral Distribution Act 1947

 
Western Australia
Western Australian Legislative Assembly